Dark at Dawn is a power metal band from Germany, formed in 1993.

Discography

Demos
The Awakening (1993)
As Daylight Fades (1994)
Oceans of Time (1995)

EPs
Noneternal (2012)

Albums
Baneful Skies (1999)
Crimson Frost (2001)
First Beams of Light/Rediscovered Tracks (2002)
Of Decay and Desire (2003)
Dark at Dawn (2006)

External links
 Official web site (English)

German heavy metal musical groups